Petrazzi is an Italian surname. Notable people with the surname include:

 Astolfo Petrazzi (1583—1665), Italian painter
 Pedro Sass Petrazzi (born 1990), Brazilian footballer

See also
 Petri
 Petrozzi

Italian-language surnames
Surnames from given names